Catshaw is a hamlet in the western parts of Penistone, in the Barnsley district, in the county of South Yorkshire, England.

Notable people
David Hey (1938–2016), author and local historian

References

Hamlets in South Yorkshire
Geography of the Metropolitan Borough of Barnsley